West Township is an inactive township in New Madrid County, in the U.S. state of Missouri.

Township was established in 1890.

References

Townships in Missouri
Townships in New Madrid County, Missouri